Wyckoff Land is an area or peninsula in Peary Land, Northern Greenland.

This geographic feature was named by Robert Peary after Clarence F. Wyckoff, one of the founding members of the Peary Arctic Club in New York.

History
When Robert Peary reached the area the weather was foggy and he assumed that the landform he stood upon was an island which he named "Clarence Wyckoff Island". He waited for two days for the fog to clear and then he returned.

Pearys Vardenæs is a cairn built in 1900 by Peary before he returned towards the west. It stands in the outermost part of Wyckoff Land between Skaerbugt and Hellefisk Fjord. Two Independence I archaeological sites have been discovered on the headland.

Geography
Wyckoff Land lies in northern Herluf Trolle Land, by the northeastern shore of Peary Land, between G.B. Schley Fjord to the west and Hellefisk Fjord to the east.

To the southwest the peninsula is attached to the mainland and to the northeast lies the Wandel Sea of the Arctic Ocean.

See also
Robert Peary§1898–1902 expeditions
Independence I culture

References

Peninsulas of Greenland
Peary Land